Victoria Umbro Select was a Canadian soccer team who played in the Premier Development Soccer League as an associate member in the 1998 season.

History
Victoria Umbro Select had been a member of the Pacific Coast Soccer League. In 1998, they joined the Premier Development Soccer League as an associate member, along with Abbotsford Athletes In Action, Okanagan Valley Challenge and Seattle Hibernian, each of whom played 8 league games, while the full league members played 16. In their 8 games, Victoria finished with only one victory, along with two shootout losses and five regulation losses.

Year-by-year

References

Defunct soccer clubs in Canada
Defunct Premier Development League teams
Umbro
Soccer clubs in British Columbia